The Orson Ames House is a historic house located at 3339 Main Street in Mexico, Oswego County, New York.

Description and history 
It was built in about 1830, and is a single-story frame structure with a heavy timber post and beam frame and plank walls. The main block is 36 feet wide and 24 feet deep. A major alteration occurred about 1930 and the kitchen was rebuilt in 1960. In 1851, Orson Ames sheltered at the home the famous fugitive slave William "Jerry" Henry.

It was listed on the National Register of Historic Places on December 4, 2001.

References

Houses on the National Register of Historic Places in New York (state)
Houses completed in 1830
Houses in Oswego County, New York
1830 establishments in New York (state)
National Register of Historic Places in Oswego County, New York